Robert Layden (January 21, 1920 – September 28, 2000) was an American football player. 

A native of Frontenac, Kansas, Layden attended Frontenac High School and played college football at Southwestern College in Winfield, Kansas.

Layden also played professional football in the National Football League (NFL) as an end and tackle for the Detroit Lions. He appeared in four NFL games during the 1943 season. 

He died in 2000 at age 80 and was buried at the Garden of Memories Cemetery in Pittsburg, Kansas.

References

1920 births
2000 deaths
Southwestern Moundbuilders football players
Detroit Lions players
Players of American football from Kansas
People from Frontenac, Kansas